The men's coxless four competition at the 2000 Summer Olympics in Sydney, Australia took place at the Sydney International Regatta Centre.

Competition format
This rowing event is a sweep rowing event, meaning that each rower has one oar and rows on only one side. Four rowers crew each boat, and no coxswain is used. The competition consists of multiple rounds. Finals were held to determine the placing of each boat; these finals were given letters with those nearer to the beginning of the alphabet meaning a better ranking. Semifinals were named based on which finals they fed, with each semifinal having two possible finals.

With 13 boats in with heats, the best boats qualify directly for the semi-finals. All other boats progress to the repechage round, which offers a second chance to qualify for the semi-finals. Unsuccessful boats from the repechage are eliminated from the competition. The best three boats in each of the two semi-finals qualify for final A, which determines places 1–6 (including the medals). Unsuccessful boats from semi-finals A/B go forward to final B, which determines places 7–12.

Schedule
All times are Australian Time (UTC+10)

Results

Heats
The first three boats of each heat advanced to the semifinals, remainder goes to the repechage.

Heat 1

Heat 2

Heat 3

Repechage
First three qualify to semifinals.

Repechage 1

Semifinals
First three places advance to Final A, the remainder to Final B.

Semifinal 1

Semifinal 2

Finals

Final B

Final A

References

External links
Official Report of the 2000 Sydney Summer Olympics
Rowing Results

Rowing at the 2000 Summer Olympics
Men's events at the 2000 Summer Olympics